Parasagitta is a genus of arrow worms (phylum Chaetognatha) in the family Sagittidae. At one time these arrow worms were classified in the genus  Sagitta.

Species
The World Register of Marine Species includes the following species in the genus:

Parasagitta chilensis (Villenas & Palma, 2006)
Parasagitta elegans (Verrill, 1873)
Parasagitta euneritica (Alvariño, 1961)
Parasagitta friderici (Ritter-Záhony, 1911)
Parasagitta megalophthalma (Dallot & Ducret, 1969)
Parasagitta peruviana (Sund, 1961)
Parasagitta popovicii (Sund, 1961)
Parasagitta setosa (Müller, 1847)
Parasagitta tenuis (Conant, 1896)

References

Chaetognatha
Protostome genera